Eupithecia carribeana is a moth in the family Geometridae. It is found in Guadeloupe and Martinique.

References

Moths described in 1986
carribeana
Moths of the Caribbean